Kingsmead Square in Bath, Somerset, England was laid out by John Strahan in the 1730s. Many of the houses are listed buildings.

History
The square was originally the junction of a number of routes entering the West Gate of the medieval city. In 1727 John Strahan started a large scale Georgian expansion in this area of pasture owned by St John's Hospital. The West Gate was demolished in the 1760s, enlarging the road junction. In 1902 the square became part of a Bath Tramways route. In 1925 a street widening scheme to tackle traffic congestion established the modern street lines of the square.

During and after World War II the square became run down. In the mid-1970s the south terrace was restored, saving it from demolition, and starting a revival of the area. In the 1990s, investment in street furniture and on the square, further revived the square, making it an attractive location for cafés.

In September 2018 Bath and North East Somerset Council initiated an informal consultation on a proposal to partially pedestrianise the square.

Buildings
Number 12, 13 and 14 is made up of Rosewell House, which forms one building with Numbers 1 and 2 Kingsmead Street. The house is named after T. Rosewell, who commissioned it from Strahan and whose sign, a rose and a well, can be seen on the baroque facade with the date 1736. It is a three-storey building with a mansard roof. The ground floor has been changed to include shop fronts, but a detached Ionic porch can still be seen. Dr Joseph Butler, the Bishop of Durham and a theologian, apologist, and philosopher died at Rosewell House in 1752. Originally, Rosewell House was situated at the end of a rank of houses, but the neighbouring 11, 12 and 13 Kingsmead Square were demolished to construct New Street on a diagonal alignment out of the square to provide better access to the new Bath Green Park railway station.

At the centre of the square is a large London Plane tree, about 20 metres tall. The square has full public access, with a ground surface of concrete slabs and cobbles.

See also

 List of Grade I listed buildings in Bath and North East Somerset
 Kingsmead, Bath

References

Grade I listed buildings in Bath, Somerset
Streets in Bath, Somerset
Grade II listed buildings in Bath, Somerset